Otto Wilhelm Harrassowitz (18 December 1845 in La Guayra, Venezuela – 24 June 1920 in Gaschwitz near Leipzig) was a German book seller and publisher.

His business, Otto Harrassowitz GmbH & Co. KG, became an important book vendor for academic and research libraries beginning in the 19th century, and survives in that role today. A subsidiary, Harrassowitz Verlag (Harrassowitz Publishing House), is an academic publishing company.

See also
 Carl Anton Baumstark
 Oriens Christianus

Notes

Further reading

External links 
  Otto Harrassowitz GmbH & Co. KG
  The Harrassowitz Publishing House

People from La Guaira
19th-century German people
German publishers (people)
Publishing companies of Germany
German expatriates in Venezuela
Venezuelan people of German descent
German people of Venezuelan descent
1845 births
1920 deaths